Trypoxylon is a genus of wasps in the family Crabronidae. All Trypoxylon species that have been studied so far are active hunters of spiders, which they paralyse with a venomous sting, to provide as food to their developing larvae. Depending on the species, they will either construct their own nest from mud or find cavities that already exist. These cavities can range from keyholes to nail holes to previously abandoned nests, and are generally sealed with mud to create cells for their larvae.

Worldwide distribution
The 634 species in this most speciose genus are found worldwide being represented in the Palearctic, Nearctic, Afrotropic (largest number of species in the Old World), Neotropic (highest number of species), Australasia (poorly represented) and Indomalayan realm.

Selected species
Source
Trypoxylon albipes F. Smith 1856
Trypoxylon attenuatum F. Smith 1851
Trypoxylon beaumonti Antropov 1991
Trypoxylon clavicerum Lepeletier & Serville 1828
Trypoxylon collinum
Trypoxylon deceptorium Antropov 1991
Trypoxylon figulus (Linnaeus 1758)
Trypoxylon fronticorne Gussakowskij 1936
Trypoxylon kolazyi Kohl 1893
Trypoxylon kostylevi Antropov 1985
Trypoxylon latilobatum Antropov 1991
Trypoxylon medium Beaumont 1945
Trypoxylon megriense Antropov 1985
Trypoxylon minus Beaumont 1945
Trypoxylon politum Drury, 1773
Trypoxylon rubiginosum Gussakowskij 1936
Trypoxylon scutatum Chevrier 1867
Trypoxylon syriacum Mercet 1906
Trypoxylon lactitarse Saussure 1842
Trypoxylon rogenhoferi Kohl 1884

Bibliography
Bohart, R. M. & Menke, A. S. 1976. Sphecid Wasps of the World: a Generic Revision. — Berkeley: Univ. California Press. — ix. 695 pp.
Tsuneki, K. 1977. Some Trypoxylon species from the southwestern Pacific (Hymenoptera, Sphecidae, Larrinae). Special Publication, Japan Hymenopterists Association 6: 20 pp.
Tsuneki, K. 1978. Studies on the genus Trypoxylon Latreille of the Oriental and Australian regions (Hymenoptera, Sphecidae) I. Group of Trypoxylon scutatum Chevrier with some species from Madagascar and the adjacent islands. Special Publication, Japan Hymenopterists Association 7: 87 pp.
Tsuneki, K. 1979. Studies on the genus Trypoxylon Latreille of the Oriental and Australian regions (Hymenoptera, Sphecidae). III. Species from the Indian subcontinent including southeast Asia. Special Publication, Japan Hymenopterists Association 9: 178 pp.
Tsuneki, K. 1981. Studies on the genus Trypoxylon Latreille of the Oriental and Australian regions (Hymenoptera Sphecidae) VIII. Species from New Guinea and South Pacific Islands. IX. Species from Australia. Special Publication, Japan Hymenopterists Association 14: 106 pp.

See also
 List of Trypoxylon species

References

External links
Trypoxylon images at Consortium for the Barcode of Life
 Catalog of Sphecidae California Academy of Sciences Institute of Biodiversity

Crabronidae
Insects of North America